Borealosuchus (meaning "boreal crocodile") is an extinct genus of crocodyliforms that lived from the Late Cretaceous to the Eocene in North America.  It was named by Chris Brochu in 1997 for several species that had been assigned to Leidyosuchus. The species assigned to it are: B. sternbergii, the type species, from the Maastrichtian (Late Cretaceous) of Colorado, Montana, North Dakota, South Dakota, and Wyoming; B. acutidentatus, from the Paleocene of Saskatchewan; B. formidabilis, from the Paleocene of North Dakota; B. griffithi, from the Paleocene of Alberta; and B. wilsoni, from the Eocene of Wyoming. B. formidabilis is particularly well-known, represented by the remains of many individuals from the Wannagan Creek site in North Dakota.

Taxonomy

Six species of Borealosuchus are currently recognized. In order of their naming, they are B. sternbergii, B. acutidentatus, B. wilsoni, B. formidabilis, B. griffithi, and B. threeensis. Four of these species (B. sternbergi, B. acutidentatus, B. wilsoni, and B. formidabilis) were originally named as species of Leidyosuchus.

A sixth species of Borealosuchus, B. threeensis, was named in 2012. Fossils of this species were found in the Inversand Company Marl Pit of Gloucester County, New Jersey. The specific name is a reference to Exit 3 of the New Jersey Turnpike, which is the closest highway exit to the type locality. The authors of the paper describing B. threeensis noted that the name is "in reference to a question every New Jersey resident encounters when traveling: 'Oh, you’re from New Jersey? Which exit?'".

Classification

Although some earlier phylogenetic studies proposed Borealosuchus to be a member of Crocodylia, recent studies are now recovering Borealosuchus as a basal eusuchian not belonging to Crocodylia, as shown in the cladogram below:

References

External links 
 Borealosuchus in the Paleobiology Database

Neosuchians
Paleocene crocodylomorphs
Eocene crocodylomorphs
Late Cretaceous crocodylomorphs of North America
Late Cretaceous reptiles of North America
Hell Creek fauna
Paleocene reptiles of North America
Eocene reptiles of North America
Fossil taxa described in 1997
Prehistoric pseudosuchian genera